Culpable  is a 1960 Argentine crime drama directed and starring Hugo del Carril. The film was based on a play by Eduardo Borrás.  The film starred Mario Soffici and Silvia Legrand.

Cast
Hugo del Carril ...  Leo Expósito
Roberto Escalada
Elina Colomer ...  The Leo Expósito's wife
Myriam de Urquijo
María Aurelia Bisutti
Ernesto Bianco ...  The Conscience
Luis Otero
Diana Ingro
Maria Esther Duckse
Carlos Olivieri ...  Raúl (as Carlitos Olivieri)
Carlos R. Costa
Mario Martín
Yamandú Romero
Mario Campodónico

External links
 

1960 films
1960s Spanish-language films
1960 crime drama films
Films directed by Hugo del Carril
Argentine crime drama films
1960s Argentine films